Patiram Parija (died 1978) was an industrialist and businessman of Eastern India. He had the sole distributorship of the Ananda Bazar Group of publications in Kolkata, India during 1960s. He was the chief patron of Nabarabi, a literary magazine in Odia language. Under his stewardship, Nabarabi started publication in July 1970 from Kolkata and continued till December 1976.

References 

People from Jagatsinghpur district
Businesspeople from Kolkata
1978 deaths

Year of birth missing